Grahams Island State Park is a protected area of North Dakota, United States.  It occupies  on the eastern flank of Grahams Island in Devils Lake.  At one time there were four recreational units on the lake, collectively known as Devils Lake State Parks, but rising water caused three units to be closed. As of 2020, only Grahams Island State Park remained in operation.  The park offers fishing, boating, picnicking, campsites, and cabins.

History
The Narrows Recreation Area at Devils Lake was added to the North Dakota park system in 1981. Grahams Island State Park, Shelvers Grove State Recreation Area, and Black Tiger Bay State Recreation Area were established in 1988. Rising lake waters caused Narrows State Recreation Area to be closed in 1995 and Shelvers Grove's closure in 2004. By 2014, Black Tiger Bay Recreation Area had been closed due to inaccessibility. When open, it offered a boat ramp with large parking area.

References

External links
Grahams Island State Park North Dakota Parks and Recreation Department
Grahams Island State Park Map North Dakota Parks and Recreation Department

State parks of North Dakota
Protected areas of Ramsey County, North Dakota
Protected areas established in 1988
1988 establishments in North Dakota